Maurizio Ceresoli (born 25 May 1983, in Modena) is an Italian auto racing driver.

His first serious racing came in 2002, with the Italian Formula Ford Series. In his first season, he finished as runner-up. One more year was spent in the championship, where he finished fifth on points, before moving on to the Italian Formula Three Championship in 2004. Two seasons were spent here, finishing ninth in his first year, and fifth in 2005, both times for the Passoli Team.

WTCC
In 2006, he competed in the FIA World Touring Car Championship, driving a full season for the independent GR Asia Team in a SEAT Toledo. From round thirteen, he switched car to a newly built SEAT Leon. His best placed finish was a fourteenth in race one at Brands Hatch. He ended the year fifth in the Yokohama Independents Trophy. For 2007 he remained with GR Asia in the Leon, but did not drive until round five at Valencia. He has also driven in the European Touring Car Cup.

Racing record

Complete World Touring Car Championship results
(key) (Races in bold indicate pole position) (Races in italics indicate fastest lap)

† Driver did not finish the race, but was classified as he completed over 90% of the race distance.

References

1983 births
Living people
Italian racing drivers
Italian Formula Three Championship drivers
World Touring Car Championship drivers
European Touring Car Cup drivers